The 28th House of Representatives of Puerto Rico was the lower house of the 16th Legislative Assembly of Puerto Rico and met from January 14, 2009, to January 8, 2013. All members were elected in the General Elections of 2008. The House had a majority of members from the New Progressive Party (PNP).

The body was counterparted by the 24th Senate of Puerto Rico in the upper house.

Composition

Leadership

Membership 

[*] Elected by Addition (Defeated in elections, but holds a seat because of Section 9 of Article III of the Constitution. See above.)

28
2009 in Puerto Rico
2010 in Puerto Rico
2011 in Puerto Rico
2012 in Puerto Rico
2013 in Puerto Rico